The Twenty-First Century is a Hong Kong intellectual journal published bimonthly, with a high standard of contributions both in the social sciences and the humanities, which played an important role in Chinese intellectual life from the early to the mid-1990s.

Overview
After the Tiananmen Square protests of 1989, the intellectual scene within mainland China was enervated, both by the effects of political conditions on the possibilities for discourse and by a sizable intellectual exodus to the West. Twenty-First Century was first published in October 1990. At first, it was the only journal available to the thinkers of the new diaspora. It therefore became a very important site for debate (for example, on conservatism and radicalism in 20th-century Chinese thought, or on China's state capacity), though it was difficult to obtain copies in the mainland. Aside from its importance in the maintenance and the progress of Chinese intellectual discourse during this time, The Twenty-First Century is also of historical importance as a document of the first stages of the internationalization of Chinese intellectual life during the 1990s. In the middle of the decade, it lost its influence to resurgent mainland journals.

See also
 Dushu, one of the few other journals that was active and influential in the immediate post-Tiananmen period, in Dushu'''s case because its content had been almost wholly apolitical during the late 1980s

Sources

Zhang Yongle. "No Forbidden Zone in Reading? Dushu and the Chinese Intelligentsia." New Left Review'' 49 (January/February 2008), 5-26.

External links
 Official website

Chinese intellectual publications
Chinese-language magazines
Magazines published in Hong Kong
Bi-monthly magazines
1990 establishments in Hong Kong
Magazines established in 1990